Palm Grove is a rural locality in the Whitsunday Region, Queensland, Australia. In the  Palm Grove had a population of 87 people.

History 
Palm Groves State School opened on 1916 but closed in 1918 due to low student numbers. On 27 January 1926 it reopened. It closed circa 1951. 

In the  Palm Grove had a population of 87 people.

References 

Whitsunday Region
Localities in Queensland